Monelle (French: Les amoureux sont seuls au monde) is a 1948 French drama film directed by Henri Decoin and starring Louis Jouvet, Renée Devillers and Dany Robin. It was shot at the Billancourt Studios in Paris and on location in the city. The film's sets were designed by the art director Emile Alex

Synopsis
Gérard Favier is a celebrated composer who is in love with his wife Sylvia. He takes on a young piano protégé Monelle and helps propel her to success, but newspaper reports suggests that they are having an affair.

Cast
 Louis Jouvet as Gérard Favier  
 Renée Devillers as Sylvia Favier 
 Dany Robin as Monelle Picart 
 Philippe Nicaud as Jules  
 Janine Viénot 
 Brigitte Auber as Christine  
 Maurice Lagrenée as Le directeur du journal  
 Émile Drain as Un critique  
 Jean Le Fort 
 Lucien Carol as Le patron du bistrot  
 Charles Vissières as Le beau-père  
 Philippe Lemaire as Claude, l'amoureux 
 Jean Heuzé as Un critique  
 Jacques Provins 
 Pierre Ringel as Le marchand de porte-bonheur  
 Léo Lapara as Ludo  
 Fernand René as Michel Picart 
 Nicole Courcel
 Robert Le Fort as Le garçon d'honneur 
 Albert Michel as Le chef de bureau 
 Geneviève Morel as La bonne des Picart

References

Bibliography 
Bazin, André . Bazin on Global Cinema, 1948-1958. University of Texas Press, 2014.

External links 
 

1948 films
French drama films
1948 drama films
1940s French-language films
Films directed by Henri Decoin
French black-and-white films
1940s French films
Films shot at Billancourt Studios
Films shot in Paris